Siping Road is an interchange station between Lines 8 and 10 on the Shanghai Metro. It began operation on 29 December 2007. It became an interchange with Line 10 when it opened on 10 April 2010.

The station is located on the boundary between Yangpu District and Hongkou District in Shanghai.

Station Layout 

Railway stations in Shanghai
Shanghai Metro stations in Hongkou District
Shanghai Metro stations in Yangpu District
Railway stations in China opened in 2007
Line 8, Shanghai Metro
Line 10, Shanghai Metro